Contemplative neuroscience (or contemplative science) is the field in which neuroscience tools, like fMRI, are used to study the effects of meditation. Founders of the field include Richard Davidson, Francisco Varela and B. Alan Wallace, among others. It often emphasizes Buddhist approaches to contemplation and meditation, and conflates meditation with various contemplative practices.

One of the field's first high-profile public gatherings was the Mind and Life Institute’s public dialogue, held at MIT in 2003, entitled 'Investigating the Mind'. Participants included the 14th Dalai Lama, Nobel Laureate scientist Daniel Kahneman and Eric Lander, Director of the MIT Centre for Genomic Research. This conference, attended by 1,200 scientists and contemplatives, marked the public birth of contemplative neuroscience in the USA.

See also 
 Compassion and Neuropsychology
 Neuroscience and Empathy
 Neurological basis of unconditional love
 Brain activity and meditation
 Research on meditation
 James Austin
 James Doty
 Mindfulness

References 

Mindfulness (psychology)
Neuroscience